Theodore Racing was a Formula One constructor from Hong Kong founded by real estate magnate and millionaire Teddy Yip. They participated in 51 grands prix, entering a total of 64 cars.

In the present day Theodore Racing is an international motor racing team owned by Teddy Yip Jr. competing in the Macau Grand Prix.

Following its last race in 1992, the team made a successful return to racing at the Macau Grand Prix in 2013 under Teddy Yip Jr., owner of GP3 team Status Grand Prix.

Theodore Racing has won a record eight Macau Grands Prix - two as an independent team with Vern Schuppan and Geoff Lees, and six as a technical support team with the likes of Alex Lynn and Felix Rosenqvist.

History
In the early 1970s, amateur racer Yip met Sid Taylor and agreed to sponsor Vern Schuppan in Formula 5000. This led to Yip backing Schuppan in Formula One with Ensign in 1974. There followed further involvement in America with Schuppan and then support of Alan Jones in the US F5000 series in 1976. In Australia, Schuppan won the Rothmans International Series for Yip driving a Lola T332-Chevrolet in 1976. That year Yip established Theodore Racing. It was run by Taylor and entered an Ensign for Patrick Tambay in F1. After a difficult year in 1977, Yip commissioned Ron Tauranac to build him an F1 car. The car, called the Theodore TR1, was difficult and Eddie Cheever failed to qualify in both Brazil and Argentina but then Keke Rosberg took over and won the International Trophy at Silverstone in the wet, although he qualified for only one GP in South Africa. The car was abandoned in the mid-season. In the US, Yip supported Dan Gurney's Eagle team.

In 1979, Yip helped to fund Ensign but the car was not a success. The car was driven by Derek Daly, Patrick Gaillard, and Marc Surer but there were no points scored. At the end of the year Teddy also funded a British F1 programme with a Wolf WR6 for David Kennedy and helped Desiré Wilson to become the first woman to win a Formula 1 race – albeit a national event.

Yip bought the Shadow team at the beginning of 1980, and Kennedy also moved to it, but the results were poor, the team was by then on its last legs, and in the mid-summer, Yip decided to retire the team and to rethink his involvement in racing and ended most of his other activities to concentrate on F1.

With Sid Taylor and Julian Randles he established Theodore Racing Ltd. and recruited Tony Southgate and team manager Jo Ramírez. The new car was dubbed the TY01 and was driven by Patrick Tambay at the start of 1981. In mid-season Tambay moved to Ligier and Yip gave the drive to Marc Surer. The same car was developed in 1982 and it became obvious that small teams could not easily survive in the turbo era. Yip merged Theodore with Ensign and used the Nigel Bennett-designed Ensign N183 design as a Theodore. The team hired Johnny Cecotto and Roberto Guerrero but at the end of that season the team shut down and Mo Nunn moved to America, where he enjoyed great success as a race engineer through the 1980s and into the 1990s and eventually set up a successful team of his own in CART. 1983 also saw a guest drive in a Theodore by former Grand Prix driver Brian Henton at the non-championship 1983 Race of Champions where he finished fourth, the highest a Theodore finished all season.

Macau Grand Prix
Yip ran a team each year at the Macau GP until the late 1980s and in 1983 was behind the switch from Formula Atlantic rules to Formula 3. The result was a huge success and Theodore Racing has won the event a record seven times, notably with Ayrton Senna in the first year of F3.

In October 2013, it was announced that the name Theodore Racing would be revived by Teddy Yip's son, Teddy Yip Jr., for the 2013 Macau Grand Prix to mark the 30th anniversary of Senna's victory in the event. After Briton Alex Lynn won the race, Teddy Yip Jr. said, "This was a fairytale way for the Theodore name to return to the great Macau Grand Prix in its anniversary year. To be with SJM to witness Alex's victory is an emotional day, and a fitting tribute to my father's contribution to this great Macau event."

Teddy Yip Jr. joined forces with Formula Three Champions, Prema Powerteam for a second consecutive year in 2014, entering a three car Macau Grand Prix team with drivers Nicholas Latifi, Esteban Ocon and Antonio Fuoco. Latifi finished fifth with Ocon crashing out during a battle for the lead and Fuoco failing to finish the race.

The trio of SJM Theodore Racing by Prema entries for the 2015 event, which utilise Mercedes-Benz powered Dallara Formula 3 cars, will be driven by Sweden's Felix Rosenqvist, Jake Dennis of Great Britain and Canada's Lance Stroll.

The 2017 Macau GP and FIA F3 World Cup event saw SJM Theodore field Callum Ilott alongside Mick Schumacher, Maximilan Gunther and Guanyu Zhou in their line up of four Mercedes-Benz Formula 3 cars. Ilott headed their qualifying score sheet with a P3, newly signed as a Ferrari Junior that month. Gunther qualified P4, Schumacher in P7 and Guanyu Zhou in P10. Ilott went on to win the Macau Qualifying Race for SJM Theodore by Prema with a lead of 7.957s ahead of the rest of the field. The other SJM Theodore cars came in with P4 (Gunther), P10 (Zhou) and P20 (Schumacher). The Sunday Macau GP was marred for SJM Theodore by a first lap racing incident between Ilott and Joel Erikkson, as Ilott retook the lead, taking them out of the lead of the race, which was won by Dan Ticktum. Gunther, Guanyu Zhou and Schumacher finished 5th, 8th, and 16th respectively.

Indy cars

Theodore began participating in Indy cars in 1977 as a sponsor for the Simpson Sport team in the USAC National Championship starting off the season with a pair of McLaren M16C-Offenhausers for Simpson to drive as No. 38 and for Steve Krisiloff to drive as No. 39.

At the season-opening Datsun Twin 200 at Ontario Motor Speedway with Simpson finishing in ninth and Krisiloff retiring due to clutch issues. Krisiloff would then leave the team. At the Indianapolis 500 Simpson retired from driving and Formula One driver Clay Regazzoni would first drive the No. 38. The car was then destroyed in a practice crash by Regazzoni. Regazzoni qualified the No. 39 in 29th place but retired from the race with a fuel leak after 25 laps, finishing in 30th place. 
After Indianapolis, Rick Mears would drive the car starting at the Schafer's 500 at Pocono International Raceway. Mears would get a best finish of fifth place at the Tony Bettenhausen 200 at Wisconsin State Fairgrounds Park Speedway. Mears would finish 20th in the final point standings.

Theodore would return in 1979 to sponsor All American Racers in the SCCA/CART PPG World Series for # Eagle 79-Cosworth DFX driven by Mike Mosley. Mosley would get a best finish of third place at the Indianapolis 500, where he would also set the fastest lap of the race. Mosley finished 10th in the championship.

In 1980, Theodore returned with AAR and Mosley. They originally fielded the No. 48 Eagle 80-Cosworth DFX at the Datsun Twin 200 at Ontario Motor Speedway. In the race, Mosley retired in 19th place due to a broken cylinder. Starting at the Indianapolis 500 the team replaced the Cosworth engine with a Chevrolet V8. Mosley qualified in 26th place and retired after five laps due to a broken gasket, finishing in 32nd place. the Theodore/AAR team appeared again at the True Value 500 at Pocono International Raceway before parting ways. In the race, Mosley qualified in fourth place and finished in 23rd place after retiring due to a burnt piston. Mosley finished 41st in the championship.

In 1981, Theodore fielded their own car. They first appeared at the Indianapolis 500 (part of the USAC Gold Crown Series) with the No. 33 Red Roof Inns McLaren M24-Cosworth DFX with Vern Schuppan driving. The car qualified in 18th place and finish in third place. The team also raced at the Van Scoy Diamond Mines 500 at Pocono International Raceway. The car started in fifth place and retired in 17th place due to a loss of oil pressure. Schuppan went on the finish 10th in the USAC standings. The team also competed in the CART/PPG World Series, with Schuppan driving. The team first appeared at the Norton Michigan 500 at Michigan International Speedway finishing in 24th place due to a blown engine. The team then went into partnership with Thomas W. Barrett III for the AirCal 500K at Riverside International Raceway, the II Copa Mexico 150 at Autodromo Hermanos Rodriguez and the Miller High Life 150 at Phoenix International Raceway. The team replaced the McLaren M24 with a March 81C for Riverside. Schuppan achieved a best finish of 15th place at Phoenix and finished 36th in points.

At the 1982 Indianapolis 500 (counted toward the 1981–82 USAC Gold Crown Series) Theodore would field with Bob Fletcher Racing a car for Desire Wilson, the No. 33 Eagle 81-Cosworth DFX. Wilson failed to qualify. Teddy Yip Sr. was attending the race while Teddy Yip Jr. was born.

In 1983, Theodore supplied factory-backed chassis for Tom Sneva and Kevin Cogan, fielded by Bignotti-Carter Racing. The chassis was practised by both drivers at the Indianapolis 500. Both would use a March 83C in the race, which Sneva won and Cogan finished in fifth place. Later in the season, Cogan used the chassis with a Cosworth DFX at the Provimi Veal 200 at Road America and the Escort Radar Warning 200 at Mid-Ohio Sports Car Course. Cogan retired from Road America in 19th place due to an electrical problem and finished sixth at Mid Ohio and in 15th place in the final standings (most of the points were scored using a March chassis). The chassis was then used by Ed Wachs Motor Sports for Jim Crawford.

Crawford achieved a fourth-place finish at the 1984 season-opening Toyota Grand Prix of Long Beach at the Streets of Long Beach. Crawford failed to qualify at the Indianapolis 500 and started one other race, the Meadowlands Grand Prix at the Meadowlands Sports Complex, retiring in 21st place due to broken suspension. Crawford would finish in 27th place in the final standings.

In 2016, Theodore Racing returned to the IndyCar Series to contest three rounds of the 2016 season; Toyota Grand Prix of Long Beach; Angie's List Grand Prix of Indianapolis and the 100th running of the Indianapolis 500, where Graham Rahal’s No. 15 Honda will be entered under 'Rahal Letterman Lanigan with Theodore Racing'.

Complete Formula One results

Notes
 – Not entered as a Constructor.

Formula One non-championship results
(key) (Races in bold indicate pole position)
(Races in italics indicate fastest lap)

References

Sources
https://www.autosport.com/f3/news/133080/eriksson-denies-norris-macau-gp-pole
http://classic.autosport.com/news/report.php/id/133107/
http://classic.autosport.com/news/report.php/id/133135/

External links 
Official website
Theodore Racing Archive

Theodore
Formula One entrants
1976 establishments in Hong Kong
Hong Kong auto racing teams
Auto racing teams established in 1976